Galium × centroniae, common name hybrid bedstraw, is a species of the family Rubiaceae. It is apparently of hybrid origin though established in the wild, a cross between G. pumilum × G. rubrum. It is native to mountainous regions of France, Switzerland, Austria, Slovenia, Croatia, and Italy (Valle d'Aosta, Lombardia, Trentino-Alto Adige, Veneto, Friuli-Venezia Giulia, Emilia-Romagna, Toscana).

References

centroniae
Flora of Italy
Flora of Switzerland
Flora of France
Flora of Austria
Flora of Slovenia
Flora of Croatia
Flora of the Alps
Plants described in 1879
Hybrid plants